Sarah Freeman may refer to:
 Sarah Freeman (skier) (born 1992), Canadian junior alpine skier
 Sarah Wilkerson Freeman (born 1956), American historian and curator